Tiger Island is an island 4 nautical miles (7 km) north of Lion Island on the north side of Granite Harbor, Victoria Land. The New Zealand Northern Survey Party of the Commonwealth Trans-Antarctic Expedition (1956–58) established a survey station on its highest point in October 1957. They named it in analogy with nearby Lion Island.

See also 
 List of antarctic and sub-antarctic islands
 Stevens Cliff

References

 

Islands of Victoria Land